Rafael Sardina, known professionally as Rafa Sardina, is a basque recording engineer, mixing engineer and record producer known for his work with Alejandro Sanz, Luis Miguel, Calle 13, D'Angelo, The Clare Fischer Big Band and Lady Gaga.

Sardina has won 5 Grammy Awards and 13 Latin Grammy Awards. He is the current governor of the Recording Academy, Los Angeles Chapter and has served on the board of trustees of the Latin Recording Academy. Sardina is a founding member and vice chairman of the Latin Recording Academy's CPI (Círculo de Productores e Ingenieros), equivalent to the Producers and Engineers Wing of the Recording Academy. He was the executive producer of the 2017 and 2018 Latin Recording Academy Person of the Year galas honoring Alejandro Sanz and Maná, respectively.

Early life and career 
Sardina was born in Bermeo, a fishing port in the Basque Country located in northern Spain. Sardina's interest in music started at a young age. At the age of 6, he secretly played his younger sister's guitar and later told his mother he wanted to become a professional musician.

His parents moved to San Diego, California when he was 15. After a couple of months, Sardina returned to Spain, finished school and started playing in bands. His first experience in a recording studio was at the age of 16, when he attended a recording session of his cousin's band in San Sebastián.

Sardina joined medical school at age 16. During his second year of school, he started working as front of house and monitor engineer for local acts. During his fourth year of school and right before taking the final exam, Sardina decided to drop out. He saved up for a three-week recording certification program at The Recording Workshop school in Chillicothe, Ohio. Sardina then went back to Spain and continued saving until he enrolled in a program at Full Sail University in Orlando, Florida.

In 1993, four weeks before graduating with a Valedictorian Award, Sardina organized a 24-hour trip to Los Angeles. He did interviews at Record Plant, Westlake Recording Studios and Ocean Way Recording, where he later started working and became assistant engineer. During his time at Ocean Way, Sardina recorded artists including Celine Dion, Madonna, Frank Sinatra, The Rolling Stones, Red Hot Chili Peppers, Dr. Dre and David Foster.

In 2001, after working for 5 years at Ocean Way, Sardina founded Fishbone Productions and started working as an independent engineer, recording at his studio "AfterHours". Sardina became better known for his work on Pop, Rock, R&B and Latin records, although he also works on a variety of genres including Jazz, Orchestral, Gospel, World and Film/TV soundtracks. He continued working with artists including Alejandro Sanz, Luis Miguel, Stevie Wonder, Michael Jackson, Lady Gaga and D'Angelo.

Sardina engineered the album "Symphonic Soweto: A Tribute To Nelson Mandela", which won the South African Music Award for Best Contemporary Album in 2018.

AfterHours Studios 
Sardina founded AfterHours Studios to record his projects. AfterHours was first located at his previous house. Sardina describes it as being "just a tiny room, tracking little things like drums in the hallway".

The studio is now located in Woodland Hills, Los Angeles, where he remodeled a two-story three-car garage and an adjacent room. The live room, control room and isolation booth are on the first floor, while an office and a lounge are located on the second floor. The studio operates around a Solid State Logic Duality console and incorporates multiple outboard processors into a digital recording system. The studio was featured on Mix Magazine's Class of 2017.

Awards and nominations

Grammy Awards

Latin Grammy Awards

References

External links 

 Interview with Rafa Sardina | Latin Recording Academy
 Pensado's Place #279 | Engineer/Producer/Mixer Rafa Sardina

Grammy Award winners
Latin Grammy Award winners
Full Sail University alumni
Latin music record producers
People from Bermeo
Spanish record producers
Living people
1968 births